This is a list of Assamese language films produced by the film industry of Assam, India based in Guwahati and publicly released in the year 2018. Premiere shows and film festival screenings are not considered as releases for this list.

Scheduled releases

January - March

April - June

July - September

October - December

Notes

References  

2018
Assamese
Assamese